The visa policy of Australia deals with the requirements that a foreign national wishing to enter Australia must meet to obtain a visa, which is a permit to travel, to enter and remain in the country. A visa may also entitle the visa holder to other privileges, such as a right to work, study, etc. and may be subject to conditions.

Since 1994, Australia has maintained a universal visa regime, meaning that every non-citizen in Australia must have a visa, either as a result of an application, or one granted automatically by law. Australia does not issue visas on arrival except for New Zealand citizens. As of 2015 there was no intention to provide visa free entry for any country.

Visitors holding passports from certain countries may apply for a visa using a truncated process:

 citizens of New Zealand using a New Zealand passport may apply for a Special Category Visa (subclass 444) on arrival pursuant to the Trans-Tasman Travel Arrangement.  There is no application form or fee payable.

 nationals of 36 countries (the 27 EU member states, the four EFTA member states, the United Kingdom, and four European microstates) may apply for a eVisitor visa (subclass 651) online without fee

 nationals from 34 countries and territories (more globally distributed than eVisitor countries) may apply for Electronic Travel Authority (subclass 601) using a mobile app on payment of a nominal fee

Under the Migration Regulations 1994, certain persons are defined as holding a valid visa, without having pursued the standard Australian visa process, including  certain visitors, mostly linked to foreign militaries and governments, eligible for entry under the special purpose visa, pursuant to a variety of Australian laws and international agreements.

Nationals of all other countries will need to apply for the Visitor visa online.

Since 1 September 2015, Australia ceased to issue visa labels on visa holders' passports, and all visas are issued and recorded on a central database. Visa records can only be accessed through Visa Entitlement Verification Online (VEVO), a digital verification service provided by the Department of Home Affairs.

Legal authority
Visa rules are set out in the Migration Act 1958 and the Migration Regulations, which are administered by the Department of Home Affairs.

Visa types

There is a large range of visas that may be applied for, for a variety of purposes, including:

 Visitor visa – for people who need to come to Australia for a short duration for tourism or business purposes. They are issued for periods up to three, six or twelve months. Selected Chinese citizens can be issued ten-year visas from the end of 2016 when applying from China.
Transit visa (subclass 771) – for people who wish to transit through Australia for less than 72 hours and who do not qualify for transit without a visa or people travelling to Australia to join a vessel as crew.
Medical treatment (subclass 602) – for people to have medical treatment or medical consultations, donate an organ or support the person who is having medical treatment in Australia but not to have medical treatment for surrogate motherhood.
Working holiday visa (subclass 417) – for people 18 to 30 years of age, who are interested to have an extended holiday while supplementing their funds with short-term work of up to 12 months (with a maximum of 6 months with one employer) and who come from Belgium, Canada, Cyprus, Denmark, Estonia, Finland, France, Germany, Hong Kong, Ireland, Italy, Japan, Malta, Netherlands, Norway, South Korea, Sweden, Taiwan or the United Kingdom.
Work and holiday visa (subclass 462) – for people 18 to 30 years of age, who are interested to have an extended holiday while supplementing their funds with short-term work of up to 12 months (with a maximum of 6 months with one employer) and who come from Argentina, Bangladesh, Brazil, Chile, China, Czech Republic, Indonesia, Malaysia, Peru, Poland, Portugal, Slovakia, Slovenia, Spain, Thailand, Turkey, the US, Uruguay or Vietnam.
Student visa (subclass 500) – for people to study full-time in a recognised education institution. This single type of visa replaced student visas with subclass numbers 570 to 576 on 1 July 2016.
Partner, Fiancé and Family Members visa – for family members (partners, parents or children) of Australian citizens or permanent pesidents or of eligible New Zealand citizens. Including Provisional Partner visa (subclass 309 and subclass 820) and Migrant Partner visa (subclass 100 and subclass 801), Fiancé, Prospective Marriage visa (subclass 300). Family Member visas including Child, Parent, Aged dependant relative, Remaining relative and Carer.
 Permanent residency visa – authorises the permanent resident to remain in Australia indefinitely and to work, as well as many other benefits such medical health coverage under Medicare.
 Resident Return Visa (RRV) (subclasses 155 and 157) – allows current and former permanent residents to travel to another country and re-enter the Australian migration zone as a permanent resident. RRVs allow the holder to re-enter Australia as often as they wish during the validity of the visa. RRVs may be issued with five years' or three months' validity.
 Special Category Visa (subclass 444) – issued under the Trans-Tasman Travel Arrangement to citizens of New Zealand who present a valid New Zealand passport and authorises the holder to enter Australia, live and work indefinitely. The visa is subject to the following conditions: no criminal convictions, no untreated tuberculosis and have not been deported, excluded or removed from any country. The visa is given on arrival at any Australian port, unless they already hold another type of Australian visa.
 Special categories for residents of Norfolk Island:On 1 July 2016, Norfolk Island became a part of the Australian migration zone. All Norfolk Island immigration permits are no longer valid. Instead, its non-citizen residents are accorded the following categories of visa depending on their previous status (except for New Zealand citizens who were automatically given the Special Category Visa):
 Provisional Resident Return visa (subclass 159) – issued to former holders of Norfolk Island immigration permits (Temporary Entry Permit (TEP) or General Entry Permit (GEP)). Holders of this visa may live and work on Norfolk Island and live in other parts of Australia only for education purposes. They may apply for the Confirmatory (Residence) visa after they meet the residence requirements on Norfolk Island.
 Confirmatory (Residence) visa (subclass 808) – issued to former holders of Norfolk Island immigration permits who were either holding an unrestricted entry permit (UEP) or who held a TEP or GEP and have fulfilled the residence requirements. Holders of this type of visa are Australian permanent residents and may live and work in Australia indefinitely, and they may freely leave and enter Australia within the visa's validity (same with the Resident Return visa). This type of visa replaced the UEP, and the Permanent Resident of Norfolk Island visa (PRNIV) which was issued to permanent residents of Norfolk Island at an Australian airport.
 Ex-citizen visa – issued under section 35 of the Migration Act 1958 to persons whose Australian citizenship has been cancelled while physically within the Australian migration zone. The person need not be told that they have lost Australian citizenship nor that they hold this visa, which entitles the visa holder to remain permanently in Australia. However, the visa ceases to have effect when the person leaves Australia, and to re-enter needs a Resident Return Visa or other permanent visa. When leaving the country they may not be aware that they hold this visa, and may have difficulties returning.

Visitor visa policy map

History
Visa formats in Australia have changed over the years. Australia was possibly one of the first countries to replace ink-based stamps with more secure stick-on labels in the 1970s.

In 1987, the then-Department of Immigration and Ethnic Affairs initiated a scheme which saw the utilization of computers to process visitor visa applications in overseas Australian missions for the first time.

In 1990, a second generation of the Immigration Records and Information System (IRIS II) was introduced as a replacement of the original 1987 scheme. At the time, IRIS II was the most advanced visa processing system in the world, simplifying immigration clearance processes at airports and enabling across-the-counter visa issue at the Australian diplomatic missions.

In 1996, the Electronic Travel Authority system (ETA) was launched. The system allows visas to be issued electronically and linked to the applicant's passport, eliminating paper application forms. Australia was the first country in the world to launch electronic visas.

Australia officially ceased the issuance of visa stickers on 1 September 2015, and all visas are issued and recorded electronically.

From July 2017, the use of outgoing departure cards ceased. Passengers were previously required to complete paper declarations upon departing Australia. Instead, the same information is now sourced automatically through electronic systems.

Physical arrival cards were replaced with a Digital Passenger Declaration mobile phone app in February 2022. In July 2022 physical paper cards were brought back and the app was scrapped due to poor user experience and difficulties it created for the travellers who were unable to use a suitable electronic device.

Electronic visas
All Australian visas are electronic visas since 2015, with details stored only in the Australian immigration database. Visa details are electronically linked to passport details. Physical labels or stamps are no longer needed. Nearly all Australian visas can be applied for online.

Short-term travelers with certain passports benefit from reciprocal visa waiver agreements with Australia. These travelers still technically require a visa but obtain them through a streamlined online process, when staying for 3 months or less. Eligible visitors apply online for an Electronic Travel Authority (ETA) or eVisitor visa depending on their nationality. Visitors eligible for an ETA may also apply through some travel agents, airlines and specialist service providers. Many applications are granted in minutes, whereas others require further checking of information.

eVisitor (subclass 651)
The eVisitor was introduced on 27 October 2008, replacing an older eVisa system, to create a reciprocal short stay travel arrangement for nationals of Australia and the European Union, while still maintaining the universal visa system. On 23 March 2013 the business and tourist purpose  visas were merged into a single application.

The eVisitor is issued free of charge and allows the holder to visit Australia for unlimited times, up to 3 months per visit, in a 12-month period for tourism or business purposes. Applicants must also satisfy the health and character requirements as for other visas.

Holders of passports of the following countries may apply for eVisitor:

The grant rate of eVisitor has been consistently high over the years, never dropping below 97.7%. In the second quarter of 2018 the lowest approval rates for tourism applications were for the nationals of Romania (75%), Bulgaria (84.8%), Latvia (86.8%), Lithuania (88.5%) and Croatia (88.9%) with all other countries having a grant rate above 95%. The eVisitor in the last quarter of 2013 was granted automatically to 85.8% of applicants but the rates differed significantly among countries. The lowest automatically granted rates in the 4th quarter were for nationals of Bulgaria (16.2%), Romania (18.3%), Czech Republic (58.6%), Lithuania (59.3%), Latvia (62.4%) and Slovakia (66.3%) with all other countries having an automatic grant rate above 70%.

In 2014, Bulgaria, Cyprus and Romania notified the European Commission that they considered that Australia required a visa for their nationals. The notification was dismissed in 2015 after Australia lifted a transit visa requirement for Bulgarians, Cypriots and Romanians and made some clarifications.

The European Commission ruled that the eVisitor's 'autogrant' treatment is not an equivalent to the Schengen visa application procedures.  Applications for high risk countries, i.e. not ETA, are routinely processed manually rather than via 'autogrant' and they are subject to additional documents prior to arrival, which is typical for a proper visa. Grant rate for eVisitor countries is less than 100%, which indicates manual processing.
Additionally, Australia's SmartGate entry system for automatically processing through passport control can only be used for countries on ETA list, not by countries on eVisitor list.
According to HPI (Henley Passport Index) methodology pre-departure government approval, like eVisitor manual processing is not considered as visa free.

In 2018, the European Union planned to introduce their own electronic travel authorisation, called ETIAS, needed for visa-exempt countries like Australia.

Electronic Travel Authority (ETA) (subclass 601)

Development of the ETA system commenced in January 1996. It was first implemented in Singapore on a trial basis on 11 September 1996, for holders of Singapore and US passports travelling on Qantas and Singapore Airlines. Implementation of online applications began in June 2001. The current ETA came into effect on 23 March 2013 replacing older ETAs (subclass 976, 977 and 956) while offering a single authorization for both tourist and business purposes.

The ETA allows the holder to visit Australia for unlimited times, up to 3 months per visit, in a 12-month period for tourism or business purposes. The application requires a service charge of A$20. Applicants must also satisfy the health and character requirements as for other visas.

Holders of passports of the following countries and territories may apply for an ETA:

Holders of passports of certain countries eligible for eVisitor may also apply for an ETA:

Online Visitor visa (e600)
Since November 2012, visa labels in passport have not been required, but were issued at a request for a fee. As of September 2015 the possibility to obtain a visa label is no longer available and records are accessible only online through the Visa Entitlement Verification Online (VEVO) service.

On 23 March 2013, a new Visitor visa (subclass 600) replaced the previous Tourist visa (subclass 676).

In the 4th quarter of 2013 the automatic grant rate for electronically lodged applications outside Australia stood at 28.3%. Previously the rate ranged from 20.4% to 63.2%.

Visa exemptions

Special purpose visa
A special purpose visa is a visa exemption given by operation of law to certain foreign nationals in Australia to whom standard visa and immigration clearance arrangements do not apply. It effectively exempts certain persons from the normal processes for entry into Australia. These include members of the Royal Family and the members of the Royal party, guests of Government, SOFA forces members including civilian component members, Asia‑Pacific forces members, Commonwealth forces members, foreign armed forces dependents, foreign naval forces members, airline positioning crew members and airline crew members, eligible transit passengers, persons visiting Macquarie Island, eligible children born in Australia and Indonesian traditional fishermen visiting the Territory of Ashmore and Cartier Islands.

Transit without visa
Some travelers do not need a Transit visa (subclass 771) if they depart Australia by air within 8 hours of the scheduled time of their arrival, hold confirmed onward booking and documentation necessary to enter the country of their destination and remain in the transit lounge at an airport (i.e. they do not need to clear immigration in order to re-check their luggage).

Holders of passports of the following countries can transit through Australia under this arrangement:
eVisitor and ETA-eligible countries
The following additional countries:

Holders of diplomatic passports, except nationals of Afghanistan, Algeria, Angola, Bahrain, Comoros, Egypt, Iran, Iraq, Jordan, Kuwait, Lebanon, Libya, Madagascar, Mauritania, Morocco, North Korea, Pakistan, Russia, Saudi Arabia, Sierra Leone, Somalia, Sudan, Syria, Taiwan, Tunisia, Yemen, Zimbabwe, and Arab Non-National Passport Holders (ANNPH).

A Transit visa is required for Gold Coast airport, and for Cairns airport and Sydney airport if staying overnight. Transit without a visa through Adelaide applies only to passengers departing on the same aircraft unless advance notice is given by the airline. In addition, those who need to leave the transit lounge for any reason must hold a valid Australian visa.

Torres Strait
Residents of thirteen coastal villages in Papua New Guinea are permitted to enter the 'Protected Zone' of the Torres Strait  (part of Queensland) for traditional purposes. This exemption from passport control is part of a treaty between Australia and Papua New Guinea negotiated when PNG became independent from Australia in 1975. Full list was determined in 2000 and includes the following 13 villages – Bula, Mari, Jarai, Tais, Buji/Ber, Sigabadaru, Mabadauan, Old Mawatta, Ture Ture, Kadawa, Katatai, Parama and Sui. They can make traditional visits (free movement without passports) as far as 10 degrees 30 minutes South latitude (near Number One Reef). Australian traditional inhabitants come from the following villages – Badu, Boigu, Poruma (Coconut Island), Erub (Darnley Island), Dauan, Kubin, St Pauls, Mabuiag, Mer (Murray Island), Saibai, Ugar (Stephen Island), Warraber (Sue Island), Iama (Yam Island) and Masig (Yorke Island). They can make traditional visits to the Papua New Guinea Treaty Villages and travel north as far as the 9 degrees South latitude (just north of Daru). Vessels from other parts of Papua New Guinea and other countries attempting to cross into Australia or Australian waters are stopped by the Australian Border Force (ABF) or the Royal Australian Navy.

External territories

Australian Antarctic Territory – an environmental authorisation must be obtained, based on an environmental impact assessment (EIA) submitted by the organiser of the activity. In some cases, where an activity organised in another country party to the Treaty and Protocol, Australia will recognise an authorisation provided by that country. As well as an environmental authorisation, permits are required for certain activities.
Christmas Island – Passports and visas are not required when travelling from the Australian mainland. However, photographic identification must be produced for clearance through Customs and Immigration. Normal Australian Customs and Immigration procedures apply when entry is made from outside Australia.
Cocos (Keeling) Islands – Passports and visas are not required when travelling from the Australian mainland. However, photographic identification must be produced for clearance through Customs and Immigration. Normal Australian Customs and Immigration procedures apply when entry is made from outside Australia.
Heard Island and McDonald Islands – a permit to enter and undertake activities in the Territory of Heard Island and McDonald Islands is required and is issued by the Australian Antarctic Division.
Macquarie Island – a written authorisation of the Director of National Parks and Wildlife is required.
Norfolk Island – From 1 July 2016 all movements between Norfolk Island and Australian mainland are considered as domestic movements, however all passengers are still required to carry passports or, for Australian citizens, some type of photographic identification and pass Customs and Immigration. Normal Australian Customs and Immigration procedures apply when entry is made from outside Australia. Passengers not carrying their passports are not eligible to purchase duty-free goods on Norfolk Island.

SmartGate

SmartGate is an automated border processing system introduced by the Australian Border Force and New Zealand Customs Service. The SmartGate is available to eligible holders of electronic passports of age 16 years or older issued by the following jurisdictions:

APEC Business Travel Card
Holders of passports issued by the following countries who possess an APEC Business Travel Card (ABTC) containing the "AUS" code on the reverse that it is valid for travel to Australia can enter visa-free for business trips for up to 90 days.

ABTCs are issued to nationals of:

Temporary entrants statistics
The number of temporary entrants and New Zealand citizens physically present in Australia is estimated every three months by identifying those who have entered Australia and those who have neither left nor granted permanent residency.

Overstaying visas
Foreign nationals who remain in Australia after their visa has expired are termed overstayers. Official government sources put the number of visa overstayers in Australia at approximately 50,000. This has been the official number of illegal immigrants for about 25 years and is considered to be low. Other sources have placed it at up to 100,000, but no detailed study has been completed to quantify this number, which could be significantly higher.

The government calculates a "Modified Non-Return Rate" of the people who arrive on a Visitor visa granted outside Australia, but do not depart before their visa expires. It is considered when assessing visa applications as an indicator of Visitor visa compliance.

Enforcement of visa restrictions
On 1 June 2013, the Migration Amendment (Reform of Employer Sanctions) Act 2013 commenced and put the onus on businesses to ensure that their employees maintain the necessary work entitlements in Australia. The new legislation enables the Department of Immigration and Border Protection to levy infringement notices against business (A$15,300) and individual (A$3,060) employers on a strict liability basis – meaning that there is no requirement to prove fault, negligence or intention.

Reciprocity issues
Whilst nationals of all member states of the European Union and Schengen associated countries were entitled to use the eVisitor system since 27 October 2008, the European Commission assessed whether the eVisitor visa fully satisfied reciprocity requirements. In its Seventh report on certain third countries' maintenance of visa requirements in breach of the principle of reciprocity from 2012, the European Commission found that in principle, the eVisitor provided equal treatment of the nationals of all member states and Schengen associated countries. However, while the average autogrant rate was high (86.36%), the quarterly reports on eVisitor application statistics showed that applications by nationals of some member states were mainly processed manually. Autogrant rates for Bulgaria and Romania were at just 18% and 23%, as the majority of applications were sent for additional examination. The Commission therefore engaged to continue to closely monitor the processing of eVisitor applications. The Commission would submit its assessment of whether eVisitor was equivalent to the Schengen visa application process in a separate document in parallel with the assessment of the Final Rule on ESTA. The Schengen Area does not have visa requirements in place for short-term stays of Australian nationals. The United Kingdom and Ireland are exempt from this particular EU policy, but still do not impose any short-term visa requirements on Australians.

In 2014, Bulgaria, Cyprus and Romania notified the European Commission that they considered Australia's low rate of automatically granted eVisitor authorisations for their nationals tantamount to a normal visa requirement for their nationals. Implications were that if the notification were accepted the EU might suspend the visa exemption for certain categories of Australian nationals, and at the latest six months after publication of the regulation, the Commission might decide to suspend the visa-free access to all Australian nationals.

Some countries regard the ETA as being equivalent to visa-free travel when deciding whether to grant the same to Australians wishing to enter their territory. The United States, for example, offers its Visa Waiver Program to Australian passport holders, and one of the conditions for joining this scheme is that "Governments provide reciprocal visa-free travel for U.S. citizens for 90 days for tourism or business purposes". However, the United States has required from January 2009 a similar ETA, called the Electronic System for Travel Authorization, from nationals of Australia. As of December 1998, Japan also granted visa-free access to Australians. Other ETA eligible countries and territories Canada, Hong Kong, Malaysia, Singapore, South Korea (90 days) and Taiwan (30 days) also grant visa-free access to Australians while Brunei grants Australians a 30-day visa on arrival.

Future
In 2014, Australia announced that among the countries discussed for visa waiver extension were the Gulf Cooperation Council countries.
In 2022, newly elected Australian Prime Minister Anthony Albanese announced his intention to include Indonesia as eligible for the Electronic Travel Authority (subclass 601).

Historic stamp gallery

Visitor statistics
According to the data with the Australian Bureau of Statistics [ABS], in 2018–19, there were approximately 9.3 million international visitors that came to Australia on short trips.1

By a short trip is implied a trip that is of a lesser duration than 1 year. As per the ABS, the number reflects the total number of border crossings in the duration rather than the number of people travelling to Australia from overseas.

Among the international visitors in Australia in 2018–19, the maximum number were Chinese nationals. With more than 1.4 million visitors across Australia, China was the biggest source country for international tourists in the Land Down Under in 2018–19.

The primary reason for international travelers to come to Australia was for holiday. Around 47% stated their reason as holiday.

When in Australia, the international travelers spent an average of 11 days in the country. While travelers spend more time in South Australia [17 days], those who visited Queensland stayed for around 10 days on an average.

The record high number of 9.3 million visitors in 2018-19 was around 3.8 million over than the number of international visitors 10 years ago, and 272,300 more as compared to a year previously.2

Generally, there has been an increase recorded in the number of international visitors to Australia in the recent decades.

Surveys have revealed that a significant number of Indians that traveled to Australia for recreation preferred heading to South Australia.

Most visitors arriving to Australia were from the following countries of nationality:

Somalia
Entry and transit is refused to  nationals, even if not leaving the aircraft and proceeding by the same flight.

Other entry restrictions due COVID-19 pandemic
During the COVID-19 pandemic, entry was not allowed for persons who had previously visited China, Iran, Italy or South Korea. A general travel ban, with limited exceptions, on non-citizens and non-residents travelling to Australia and Australians travelling overseas was introduced on 20 March.

See also

Visa requirements for Australian citizens
Tourism in Australia
Australian migration zone
Immigration to Australia
Passenger Movement Charge

Notes

References

External links
Department of Home Affairs
ETA:
Australian Government - Electronic Travel Authority
Department of Home Affairs - ETA (Visitor) (Subclass 601)
eVisitor:
Department of Home Affairs - eVisitor

 
International travel documents
Australia